Wright Robinson (1876 – 1961) was a British trade unionist and politician.

Born in Burnley, Robinson completed an apprenticeship as a carpenter.  When he was 23, he was seriously injured in a fall, and then discovered that he had tuberculosis.  He went to Canada to recuperate, returning by 1900, when he joined both the Independent Labour Party (ILP) and the Fabian Society.  At the time, he was highly religious, but he later became a humanist.

In 1911, Robinson was elected to Blackburn council, then in 1913, he became the ILP's Liverpool organiser.  He returned to Manchester in 1917, when he began working for the National Union of Warehouse and General Workers.  In 1919, he was elected to Manchester City Council, representing Beswick, then later became an alderman.  In 1921, his union became part of the new National Union of Distributive and Allied Workers (NUDAW), with Robinson remaining an organiser.

Robinson moved to Burnage in the 1930s, and retired from NUDAW in 1941.  That year, he served as Lord Mayor of Manchester.  During World War II, he promoted co-operation with the Soviet Union.  He was rumoured to have rejected a seat in the House of Lords in 1945.  Wright Robinson College in Gorton and Wright Robinson Hall (on the UMIST site in Manchester) were named after him.

References

1876 births
1961 deaths
Councillors in Lancashire
Lord Mayors of Manchester
English trade unionists
Labour Party (UK) councillors
People from Burnley